Hal Reilly (born Harold John Reilly) (April 1, 1894 – December 24, 1957) was a Major League Baseball left fielder. He was a member of the Chicago Cubs in 1919. He appeared in only one major league game and went 0-for-3.

References

Sportspeople from Oshkosh, Wisconsin
Baseball players from Wisconsin
Chicago Cubs players
Major League Baseball left fielders
1894 births
1957 deaths